Seymour Michael Blinder (born March 11, 1932 in New York City) is a professor emeritus of chemistry and physics at the University of Michigan, Ann Arbor and a remote working senior scientist with Wolfram Research in Champaign, Illinois.

Personal
He attended Cornell University and received an A.B. in physics and chemistry in 1953. He received an A.M. in physics in 1955 and a Ph.D. in chemical physics in 1958 from Harvard University under Professors W. E. Moffitt and J. H. van Vleck (Nobel Laureate in Physics 1977).

Academic positions
 Johns Hopkins University, Applied Physics Laboratory, senior physicist, 1958–1961
 Carnegie Institute of Technology (now Carnegie-Mellon University), assistant professor, 1961–1962
 Harvard University, visiting professor, 1962–1963
 Visiting research fellow, University College London, 1965–1966
 Visiting research fellow, Centre de Méchanique Ondulatoire Appliquée, Paris, 1970
 Visiting research fellow, Mathematical Institute, Oxford, 1971
 University of Michigan, professor, 1963–1995
 University of Michigan, professor emeritus 1996–present
 Wolfram Research Inc., senior scientist 2007-present

Honors and awards
Blinder has received the following awards and honors:
 Phi Beta Kappa, 1953
 National Science Foundation Predoctoral Fellowships, 1953–1955
 Guggenheim Fellowship, 1965–1966
 National Science Foundation Senior Postdoctoral Fellowship, 1970–1971 
 Rackham Research Fellowships, University of Michigan, 1966 and 1977

Interests
Research interests include: Theoretical Chemistry, Mathematical Physics, applications of quantum mechanics to atomic and molecular structure, theory and applications of Coulomb Propagators, structure and self-energy of the electron, supersymmetric quantum field theory, quantum computers.

During his academic career, S M taught a multitude of courses in graduate level Quantum Mechanics, Statistical Mechanics, Thermodynamics, Electromagnetic Theory, Relativity, and Mathematical Physics.

Personal interests include: Playing cello, classical music, and chess (S M is a former Junior Chess Master).

Books and publications

Blinder has authored over 200 journal articles in theoretical chemistry and mathematical physics. He has also published six books:
 Advanced Physical Chemistry; A Survey of Modern Theoretical Principles (Macmillan, New York, 1969)
 Foundations of Quantum Dynamics (Academic Press, London, 1974)
 Introduction to Quantum Mechanics (Elsevier Academic Press, 2004; 2nd Edition 2020)
 Guide to Essential Math: For Students in Physics, Chemistry, and Engineering (Elsevier Academic Press, 2008; 2nd Edition 2013)
Twenty-First Century Quantum Mechanics: Hilbert Space to Quantum Computers (Springer, 2017)
Mathematical Physics in Theoretical Chemistry (Elsevier, 2019)
Mathematics, Physics & Chemistry with the Wolfram Language (World Scientific, 2022)

1932 births
Living people
Cornell University alumni
Harvard University alumni
University of Michigan faculty
Wolfram Research people